Igor Dimitrijević (born 13 August 1992) is a Serbian football forward who plays for Jagodina.

Career
He had started in Jagodina, and had one appearance for team in season 2008–09,  as a player of youth school. He left to Lučani, because in that time were a lot of players on attacking positions in team of Jagodina. After that, he moved to Sloga Despotovac, and later in Trgovački Jagodina. He was one of the lead players to existence of Trgovački in Serbian League. He returned to Jagodina, but didn't play, and he forward to Trgovački again, on loan this time. For second half of season 2012–13, he scored 5 goals on 12 appearances, for Trgovački.

References

External links
 Profile at Jagodina official website
 Igor Dimitrijević at sportal.rs
 
 
 Igor Dimitrijević at fieldoo.com

1992 births
Living people
Sportspeople from Jagodina
Association football forwards
Serbian footballers
FK Jagodina players
FK Mladost Lučani players
Serbian SuperLiga players